Lány is a municipality and village in Kladno District in the Central Bohemian Region of the Czech Republic. It has about 2,300 inhabitants. A major sight is the Lány Castle; Tomáš Garrigue Masaryk (1850–1937), the first President of Czechoslovakia, is buried in Lány cemetery.

Administrative parts
The village of Vašírov is an administrative part of Lány.

Etymology
The word lány means in Czech "fields" or "tracts (of land)".

Geography
Most of the municipality is located in the Křivoklát Highlands and in the Křivoklátsko Protected Landscape Area.

History
The first written mention of Lány is from 1392.

Until 1918, the municipality was part of the Austrian monarchy (Austria side after the compromise of 1867), in the Schlan (Slaný) district, one of the 94 Bezirkshauptmannschaften (district office) in Bohemia.

The second oldest horse-drawn iron wagonway in continental Europe operated between Prague and Lány (originally planned to reach Plzeň) from 1830 until 1869. Its final station was in present-day forester's lodge of Píně.

Transport
Lány is served by the railway station in Stochov, close to the municipal border.

Sights
The major landmark of Lány is Lány Castle, serving as a summer residence of Czechoslovak and later Czech presidents. There is also a sports car museum and Museum of T. G. Masaryk, the first President of Czechoslovakia.

Lány Castle
In the 16th century, a Renaissance fortress was built in Lány. In 1592, the fortress was rebuilt into a hunting castle. It changed owners many times and underwent a major reconstruction in 1902–1903. In 1921, it was purchased by the Czechoslovak state and designated as an official summer presidential residence. Slovene architect Jože Plečnik was commissioned to make improvements both to the castle and the adjacent park. T. G. Masaryk liked the castle and was allowed to stay there after his abdication in 1935 until his death in 1937. From 1921 served as his favourable summer residence. During World War II, the castle was a residence of Emil Hácha, an increasingly ill and incapacitated President of Protectorate of Bohemia and Moravia.

The castle was used only rarely during the Communist era. Many valuable artefacts, especially those designed by Jože Plečnik, were discarded during the tenure of Gustáv Husák. Only after the Velvet Revolution did the new President Václav Havel start to come to the castle regularly. Since then, it has been a place of many official sessions between the president and other top politicians.

The castle itself is closed to the public. The castle park is partially accessible.

Notable people
 Tomáš Garrigue Masaryk (1850–1937), first President of Czechoslovakia; buried in Lány cemetery
 Charlotte Garrigue Masaryk (1850–1923), wife of Tomáš Garrigue Masaryk; buried in Lány cemetery 
 Jan Masaryk  (1886–1948), son of Tomáš and Charlotte Garrigue Masaryk; buried in Lány cemetery
 Alice Masaryková (1879–1966), daughter of Tomáš and Charlotte Garrigue Masaryk; buried in Lány cemetery 
Zdeněk Nedvěd (born 1975), ice hockey player

Gallery

References

External links

Lány Castle

Villages in Kladno District